Brzeziniak  (German Birkenthal) is a settlement in the administrative district of Gmina Zalewo, within Iława County, Warmian-Masurian Voivodeship, in northern Poland.

References

Brzeziniak